The United States secretary of veterans affairs is the head of the United States Department of Veterans Affairs, the department concerned with veterans' benefits, health care, and national veterans' memorials and cemeteries. The secretary is a member of the Cabinet and second to last at sixteenth in the line of succession to the presidency (the position was last until the addition of the United States Department of Homeland Security in 2006). Until the appointment of David Shulkin in 2017, all appointees and acting appointees to the post were United States military veterans, but that is not a requirement to fill the position.

When the post of secretary is vacant, the deputy secretary or any other person designated by the president serves as acting secretary until the president nominates and the United States Senate confirms a new secretary.

Denis McDonough is currently serving as the 11th secretary of veterans affairs since February 9, 2021 under President Joe Biden.

List of secretaries of veterans affairs
 Parties
 (2)
 (3)
 (6)
 Status

 Anthony Principi served as Acting Secretary in his capacity as Deputy Secretary of Veterans Affairs September 26, 1992 – January 20, 1993.

 Hershel W. Gober served as Acting Secretary in his capacity as Deputy Secretary of Veterans Affairs July 13, 1997 – January 2, 1998 and July 25, 2000 – January 20, 2001.

 West served as Acting Secretary from January 2, 1998 to May 4, 1998.

 Gordon H. Mansfield served as Acting Secretary in his capacity as Deputy Secretary of Veterans Affairs October 1 – December 20, 2007.

See also
Administrator of Veterans Affairs (United States)
Veterans Health Administration

References

External links 
 

|-

Veterans Affairs
Veterans Affairs
Secretary
United States Secretaries of Veterans Affairs